8701 Evolution Tour was the debut concert tour by American recording artist Usher. Visiting North America, Asia, Canada, and Africa the tour accompanies his third studio album, 8701 (2001). Following a milestone, 8701 sold 6 million copies worldwide and spawning two Billboard Hot 100 number one singles "U Remind Me", "U Got It Bad" and hit song "U Don't Have To Call".

Background
Usher originally planned to embark on a supporting tour for the album with a starting date of November 29, 2001 in Baltimore to an end date of December 30 in Los Angeles.  Titled by his fans the Evolution 8701 Tour, the original tour plan—to which Usher would perform in venues that held 5,000 to 12,000 seats—was postponed, due to Usher dislocating his shoulder during a rehearsal. Once recovered, Usher announced new tour dates, and commented: "I'm really looking forward to getting out and performing live onstage. Now that my arm is healed, I'm ready to get out there and interact with my fans. Nothing compares to that excitement and energy." Usher would perform in over forty North America Cities, with opening acts including singer Faith Evans, and rappers Nas and Mr. Cheeks. The tour commenced on April 25, 2002, in Denver and concluded on July 7, 2002, in New Orleans.

Concert synopsis
The show began with his guitarist playing the National Anthem proceeding with an introduction in the background while his dancers hit the stage, Usher emerges jumping from the top of the spiral stage wearing a leather vest and shorts. Kicking off with "I Don’t Know" then going into "If I Want To" sparkles and pyrotechnics off his latest, 8701. During "Just Like Me" Leah Greenblatt said "Usher acted as the eye of a sexed-up storm, surrounded by dancers who gyrated and moved up and down a stripper's pole with skills not learned at Arthur Murray." Next he performed "I Can't Let U Go" white wearing a leather bandana and black shredded shirt he rips off. He exited again for another costume change as a video showed him and one of his dancers engaging in a dance seduction, fading to black just in PG-13 time. Next, donning a white fedora and coat, Usher emerged for "Bedtime" and "Nice and Slow." The intro to "U Got it Bad" presented flashes on lighting as he walked from top of the spiraling stage to the main stage where his mic stand.  Leading the crowd in a "U Don’t Have to Call" sing. He ended his performance remembering loved ones they had lost, flashing the names of the Notorious B.I.G., Tupac Shakur, Aaliyah and Lisa "Left Eye" Lopes on an overhead screen as he segued into Marvin Gaye's "What's Going On." After introducing his band and dancers, he got the crowd to flash peace and love signs.

Set list
 "National Anthem into Bio Video"
 "I Don't Know"
 "If I Want To"
 "Just Like Me"
 "I Can't Let U Go"
 "Romantic Transition Video"
 "Bedtime"
 "Nice & Slow"
 "I Need a Girl"
 "Twork It Out"
 "8701 Interlude"/"U Got It Bad"
 "My Way"
 "You Make Me Wanna..."
 "U Remind Me"
 "U Don't Have to Call"
 "What's Going On"

Critical reception
The tour garnered generally positive reviews from critics. Randy Lewis from the Los Angeles Times stated "The choreography was sporadically dazzling, and in a brief solo number near the end of the show, he suddenly pulled together a routine hinting that he might give Prince or Michael Jackson of yore a run for their money." A reporter from the San Francisco Chronicle says "Usher is so smooth, he literally slides. Usher arrived with a burst of fireworks and an energetic performance and showed why he's made a successful transition. The audience loved it all and sang along lustily to a string of hits." Soren Baker from the Cincinnati Enquirer praised "the 23-year-old Atlantan proved you can sing and dance at the same time. Of course, that's how James Brown, Jackie Wilson and Usher's most obvious role model Michael Jackson did it, but in today's high-tech, gimmicky concerts, it's a lost art."

Opening acts
Faith Evans
Nas
Mr. Cheeks

Source:

Date

Personnel
 Keys: Rudolfo Valdez Brantley & Buddy Strong
 Drums: Mike 'Big Mike' Clemons
 Guitar & Keys: Natural

References

Usher (musician) concert tours
2002 concert tours